Orpecovalva mallorcae is a moth of the family Autostichidae. It is found on the Balearic Islands in the Mediterranean Sea.

References

Moths described in 1975
Orpecovalva
Endemic fauna of the Balearic Islands